A-body may refer to two different automobile platforms:
 GM A platform, a midsize platform that was first rear-wheel, then front-wheel drive
 Chrysler A platform, a compact rear-wheel drive platform